Nada Hazel Clark (10 October 1922 – 4 August 1964) was a New Zealand trade unionist. She was born in Sydney, New South Wales, Australia on 10 October 1922.

References

1922 births
1964 deaths
New Zealand trade unionists
Australian emigrants to New Zealand
People from Sydney